Kevin Clark (born December 29, 1987) is a Canadian professional ice hockey forward. He is currently playing with Eisbären Berlin of the Deutsche Eishockey Liga (DEL).

Playing career 

Prior to turning professional, Clark attended the University of Alaska Anchorage where he played four seasons with the Alaska Anchorage Seawolves men's ice hockey team which competes in NCAA's Division I in the WCHA conference.

Clark turned pro in 2010 and joined the Manitoba Moose of the American Hockey League. In 2011, he joined the AHL St. John’s Ice Caps before signing with Krefeld Pinguine of the German top-flight Deutsche Eishockey Liga (DEL) in February 2013. He finished the 2012-13 campaign with the team and had his contract renewed for the following season, which turned out to be a very successful one: He finished the 2013-14 DEL regular season as the league’s third-leading scorer with 30 goals and 38 assists.

In June 2014, Clark signed with the DEL side Hamburg Freezers, where he continued his scoring prowess, tallying 32 goals and 34 assists in 52 games during the 2014-15 DEL season. He was named DEL Player of the Year and DEL Forward of the Year.

Clark left Germany to sign a one-year contract with the SCL Tigers of the Swiss top-flight National League A on May 6, 2015. Clark made 42 NLA appearances for the Tigers in the 2015-16 regular season, recording 18 goals and 19 assists. In the relegation round, he chipped in with three goals and dealt out eleven assists in twelve games.

On June 5, 2016, he signed with Brynäs IF of the Swedish Hockey League (SHL).

During the 2018–19 season, having appeared in 38 games with Dinamo Riga of the Kontinental Hockey League (KHL), Clark left the club to sign a three-year contract in a return to Switzerland with SC Rapperswil-Jona Lakers on January 3, 2019.

International play 
 

In December 2015, Clark helped Team Canada win the Spengler Cup.

Career statistics

Awards and honours

References

External links

1987 births
Living people
Alaska Anchorage Seawolves men's ice hockey players
Brynäs IF players
Canadian ice hockey right wingers
Dinamo Riga players
Eisbären Berlin players
Hamburg Freezers players
Krefeld Pinguine players
Manitoba Moose players
SC Rapperswil-Jona Lakers players
St. John's IceCaps players
SCL Tigers players
Ice hockey people from Winnipeg
Canadian expatriate ice hockey players in Latvia
Canadian expatriate ice hockey players in Germany
Canadian expatriate ice hockey players in Switzerland
Canadian expatriate ice hockey players in Sweden